Augustine Prévost (born Augustin Prevost) (22 August 1723 – 5-6 May 1786) was a Genevan soldier best known for his service in the British Army during the Seven Years' War and the American War of Independence.

Early life and career
Prévost was born on 22 August 1723 in Geneva, Republic of Geneva. He was the son of Augustin Prévost, a member of Geneva's Council of Two Hundred, and Louise Martine. He began his military career in service of the Kingdom of Sardinia, and later became an officer in Dutch service.

Career in the British Army
Like his younger brothers Jacques-Marc and Jacques Prévost, Prévost entered British service as a major in the 60th Regiment of Foot (Royal American Regiment) at the regiment's establishment in 1756. He fought in the French and Indian War, during which he suffered a wound.

In 1763 he briefly acted as the interim military Governor of West Florida. After the war, Prévost was posted to the West Indies, where he served as deputy inspector general at Kingston, Jamaica. He was promoted to colonel in 1774.

American War of Independence

By the summer of 1776, Prévost was in charge of a contingent of the 60th stationed in St. Augustine, the capital of British East Florida. In the winter of 1778, following a proposal of Lord George Germain, Prévost, now a brigadier general, was given orders by General Sir Henry Clinton to invade Georgia. Prévost dispatched two units north: one under the command of lieutenant-colonel Lewis V. Fuser and the other under his brother Jacques-Marc.

Prévost arrived at Savannah, Georgia on 17 January 1779 which was protected by British Lieutenant Colonel Archibald Campbell. Prévost assumed command but also sent the message to General Clinton that he wished to resign, believing that a younger man should take his place. In May 1779, his troops launched an unsuccessful raid against Charles Town, South Carolina, and looted the countryside during their retreat. The major engagement of the affair was the Battle of Stono Creek, a British victory. In September 1779, Brigadier General George Garth was sent to replace him, travelling from New York on HMS Experiment. Garth was, however, captured before he could reach Savannah and Prévost remained to defend the town from a combined French and Continental force in an action that came to be known as the siege of Savannah.

Prévost retired to England in 1780. He died in East Barnet, London on 5 or 6 May 1786.

Personal life
In 1765, Prévost married Anne Grand, daughter of Swiss banker Georges Grand, who managed loans granted by France to the United States during the Independence War. He was the father of Lieutenant-General Sir George Prévost and Major Augustine Prévost  (Geneva, 1744 – Greenville, NY, 1821). He was a member of the Albany Masonic Temple after 1768.

Descendants of Prévost settled in the United States and Peru.

References

Bibliography 
A regimental chronicle and list of officers of the 60th, or the King's, royal rifle corps by Nesbit Willoughby Wallace
Notices généalogiques sur les familles-genevoises by Jacques Augustin Galiffe, Eugène Ritter, Louis Dufour-Vernes, 1833, p. 277.
"The American Revolution in the Southern Colonies" by David Lee Russell

1723 births
1786 deaths
British Army generals
British Freemasons
18th-century military personnel from the Republic of Geneva
18th-century Dutch military personnel
British military personnel of the French and Indian War
British Army personnel of the American Revolutionary War
Royal American Regiment officers